Single-8 is a motion picture film format introduced by Fujifilm of Japan in 1965 as an alternative to the Kodak Super 8 format. The company Konan (that developed the Konan-16 subminiature camera) claims in its history page to have developed the Single-8 system in 1959.

Although never as popular internationally as Super 8, the format continued to live in parallel. As of early  2007, Fuji still manufactures two versions of Single-8 film. Fujichrome R25N is Daylight Balanced Filmstock, while Fujichrome RT200N is Tungsten Balanced(3400K) for indoor filming.

Details
Although the film is thinner, the other dimensions of Single-8 such as the sprocket holes and sound track, are the same as Super 8. Single-8 can be projected in Super 8 projectors and vice versa. Single-8 comes pre-loaded in B-shaped cartridges, with two separate spools unlike the coaxial system of Super 8. As a result, Single-8 film offered unlimited rewind, whereas Super 8 rewind was limited to several seconds and relied on there being sufficient empty space within the cartridge for the rewound film to pile up inside.

The Single 8 cartridge was designed to use the camera's film gate to hold the film in place during exposure.  This contrasted with the Kodak system which had a plastic pressure plate built into the cartridge. It was widely believed by Single 8 enthusiasts that this would offer superior film positioning, but the reality was that Super 8's plastic pressure plate could be moulded with far smaller tolerance than Single 8's metal version could be machined.

It has a polyester base that is thinner than the Kodak films, so splicing the two formats together in a finished film may require adjustment of the projector's focus at the join.

Although never as popular internationally as Super 8, the format continued to live in parallel. As of early  2007, Fuji still manufactures two versions of Single-8 film. Fujichrome R25N is Daylight Balanced Filmstock, while Fujichrome RT200N is Tungsten Balanced(3400K) for indoor filming. The Sound Film brand is no longer made, although a magnetic sound stripe can be added to the film after processing. This option is chosen whenever sending the exposed film to Fuji in Japan. In addition to Fuji's own film, black and white film is available from Japanese company Retro Enterprises. This Single-8 black & white reversal film, named Retro X, is of ASA/ISO 200 and is manufactured in Germany.

Although Fujifilm has stopped exportation of Single-8 Film to other countries, individual companies in the United States and Europe import the filmstock independently. Single-8 is readily available in its home country of Japan where even used cameras can reach high prices in online auctions on Yahoo! Japan. A used Fujica ZC1000, the top-of-the-line Single-8 camera, can fetch prices upwards to 250,000 Japanese yen (approx $2900). Daicon Film of Japan (now Gainax) produced a series of well-known tokusatsu films in the 1980s using Single-8 film, some now available on DVD.

Processing Single-8 Film 

Fuji's Single-8 developing process is not the same as Process EM-26, but close. There is more involved in the removal of the remjet antihalation backing than the now long discontinued Kodak Ektachrome Process EM-26 films. The color chemistry while close, is a bit different, particularly the Color Developer.

It is often recommended to send Fuji Single-8 film to Fujifilm in Japan for processing. It averages about three weeks. They are a mechanised lab set up to process their own filmstock.

See also
List of film formats

References

External links

General
American website providing Single 8 info and manuals
(Wayback Machine copy)
Film formats history
Info on "Return of Ultraman", movie shot in Single-8 with a Fujica ZC1000 camera. Japanese only.
(Wayback Machine copy)

Commercial sites offering filmstock and processing
Super8 Reversal Lab Netherlands, a company selling most Single-8 films and processing some stocks 
 Retro Enterprises, in Tokyo, Japan - source Single-8 (and other format) films and processing

Audiovisual introductions in 1965
Motion picture film formats
Fujifilm